Castiarina macarthuri is a species of Australian beetle in the jewel beetle family, Buprestidae, described in 2005.

References

macarthuri
Beetles described in 2005
Beetles of Australia